Rosignano Airfield is an abandoned World War II military airfield in Italy, located near the comune of Rosignano Marittimo  in the Province of Livorno in Tuscany.

The area was captured by the Fifth Army in the early summer of 1944, and the airfield was used by the United States Army Air Force Twelfth Air Force in 1945 during the Italian campaign.  Known units assigned were:

 416th Night Fighter Squadron, P-61 Black Widow, 1 September-1 October 1944
 Operations included defensive patrols of Naples, Leghorn (Livorno), Pisa and Florence.  Also provided air defense of Fifth Army operations and intruder sweeps of the Po Valley in Northern Italy.

 62d Troop Carrier Group, 30 September 1944-8 January 1945
 4th, 7th, 8th, 51st, 517th TC Squadrons, C-47 Skytrain

 47th Bombardment Group, October–11 December 1944
 84th, 85th, 86th, 97th, Bomb Squadrons, A-26 Invader

 64th Troop Carrier Group, 10 January-23 May 1945
 16th, 17th, 18th, 35th TC Squadrons, C-47 Skytrain

 2641st Special Group, 24 March-20 May 1945
 859th Bomb Squadron, B-24 Liberator
 Engaged in special operations assigned to Fifteenth Air Force.

The 457th Air Service Squadron provided base support functions for the station, and the 904th Base Security Battalion provided security for the airfield and ground station.

The USAAF ended its operations at Rosignano about 30 September 1945 when  the 117th Army Airways Communications Squadron closed its facility on the station.  Today there is little or no evidence of the airfield, as the land has been returned to agricultural use.

References

 Maurer, Maurer. Air Force Combat Units of World War II. Maxwell AFB, Alabama: Office of Air Force History, 1983. .
 
 USAFHRA Records Search, Rosignano

External links

Airfields of the United States Army Air Forces in Italy
Aviation in Italy
Italy in World War II
Airports established in 1944